The Shattered Illusion is a 1928 Australian silent film about a rich financier who is shipwrecked. Unlike many Australian silent films, a copy of it exists today.

Plot
Financier Lewis Alden has a nervous breakdown and loses his memory. He joins the crew of a ship and is marooned after a storm at sea, along with Joyce. The shock of his causes him to regain his memory. One day he discovers a drifting lifeboat containing several newspapers and he discovers to his dismay that his companies have thrived in his absence and he is not as important as he once thought. He finds comfort from Joyce and after the two of them are rescued, decides to live on her family's plantation in New Guinea.

Cast
J Robertson Aiken as Lewis Alden
Gret Wiseman as Joyce Hilton
Don Winder as John Galway
Mary McDermott as Alice Newton
Jack Hooper as Dr Haynes
A.G. Harbrow as Dr Haynes
Alec Sutherland as tramp
Norman Arthur as John Elsworth
Clare Dight as Mrs Elsworth

Production
The film was shot in July and August 1927, with interiors filmed in a backyard studio in Abbotsford, Melbourne.

It was the first movie from Victorian Film Productions, who later made a comedy short, The Tramp (1929), and the feature, Tiger Island (1930).

References

External links

The Shattered Illusion at National Film and Sound Archive

1928 films
Australian drama films
Australian silent feature films
Australian black-and-white films
1928 drama films
Silent drama films
1920s English-language films